Dala also written as Tala or Darla is a town in southwestern Bhutan. It is located in Chukha District, 11 km from Gedu town. 

At the 2005 census its population was 1,652.

The Bhutan Board Products Ltd. (BBPL) has a large particle board manufacturing plant in Darla.

References 

Populated places in Bhutan